The 2007 Mid-Continent Conference men's basketball tournament took place between Saturday, March 2, 2007 and Tuesday, March 5, 2007, at the John Q. Hammons Arena in Tulsa, Oklahoma.

The Oral Roberts Golden Eagles won the championship to secure their 4th trip to the NCAA Men's Division I Basketball Championship.

This was the conference's final tournament under the Mid-Continent Conference name. During the 2007 offseason, the MCC adopted its current name of The Summit League.

Format
Each of the 8 men's basketball teams in the Mid-Continent Conference received a berth in the conference tournament.  Teams were seeded by conference record with the following tie-breakers:
 Head-to-head competition
 Winning percentage vs. ranked conference teams (starting with #1 and moving down until the tie is broken)
 Coin flip

Seeding
The following were the seeds for the conference tournament, along with conference record.
 Oral Roberts, 12–2
 Oakland, 10–4
 Valparaiso, 9–5
 IUPUI, 7–7
 Southern Utah, 6–8 *
 UMKC, 6–8
 Western Illinois, 3–11 **
 Centenary, 3–11
* Received #5 seed based on 1–1 record vs. #3 Valparaiso while UMKC had an 0–2 record vs. Valparaiso.  The teams split head-to-head and had identical records vs. #1 Oral Roberts (0–2) and #2 Oakland (0–2).
** Received #7 seed based on 1–1 record vs. #2 Oakland while Centenary had an 0–2 record vs. Oakland.  The teams split head-to-head and had identical records vs. #1 Oral Roberts (0–2).

Bracket

References

Tournament
Summit League men's basketball tournament
Basketball competitions in Tulsa, Oklahoma
2007 in sports in Oklahoma
College sports tournaments in Oklahoma